Andrew Henry Mapple  (3 November 1962 – 22 August 2015) was a British-American professional water skier. Competing professionally between 1981 and 2004, Mapple is regarded as the greatest slalom skier of all time. During his career he won six World Championships, 168 professional events, and set or tied the world record on eleven occasions.

Biography
Mapple was born in Lytham to Roy and Janet Mapple and grew up in Warton with both his sisters, Susan and Christine. At age 13 Mapple first learned to water ski at Windermere, being taught by his older sister Susan. Mapple attended Carr Hill High School in Kirkham, and during his time there was allowed to leave for extended periods to train at Princes Water Ski Club and Thorpe Waterski under the tutelage of his first coach Paul Seaton - European Champion 1972, 1974 and 1975. After winning his first World Slalom title in 1981 aged 18, Mapple spent winters in Florida and summers at Thorpe Waterski until moving to Florida permanently in the mid 1980s.

Mapple retired at the end of the 2004 season.

During his career Mapple founded his own company, Mapple Waterskis. The company was dissolved, but Andy's design carries on via Square One out of Washington. In 1987 he married Deena Brush, a professional water skier also. The couple lived on Lake Butler and had two children, Michael and Elyssa.

Mapple died in Florida on 22 August 2015.

Achievements

References

1962 births
2015 deaths
British water skiers
Male professional water skiers
People from Lytham St Annes
World Games silver medalists
Competitors at the 1981 World Games
Sportspeople from Lancashire